Heathrow Terminals 2 & 3 railway station (also known as Heathrow Central) serves Terminal 2 and Terminal 3 (and formerly Terminal 1 before its closure and replacement by Terminal 2 in 2015)  at London Heathrow Airport.

It is served by Heathrow Express trains direct to central London and Elizabeth line trains that stop at local stations.

Transport for London Travelcards are not valid on Express services from the station, although they are valid on the Elizabeth line. Passengers transferring between any of the terminals at Heathrow may use the trains free of charge.

Services

The station was opened on 23 June 1998 upon the completion of the Heathrow Express Rail Link linking Heathrow Airport with direct non-stop services to Central London. In contrast to the station at Terminal 5, the platforms at Heathrow Central do not lie adjacent to the London Underground Piccadilly line platforms at Heathrow Terminals 2 & 3 station. Instead they lie perpendicular, and at a far deeper level. This is because the railway line from Paddington was tunnelled into Heathrow from the north, whereas the Piccadilly line approaches from the east. Access to the station is reached via an underground pedestrian walkway which links Terminal 3 to the Central Bus Station and the Piccadilly line's Heathrow Terminals 2 & 3 station.

The station has services running directly between Paddington station in Central London and Heathrow Terminal 5 provided by Heathrow Express, normally running every 15minutes. It is also served by the Elizabeth line, which opened in 2022 and currently has a typical service running 6 times per hour stopping at all stations into Central London, half hourly to Terminal 5 and every 15 mins to Terminal 4. 

Elizabeth line trains now continue beyond Paddington through new tunnels, stopping at stations in the West End and the City of London and on to Abbey Wood in southeast London via Canary Wharf. From May 2023 trains will also travel to Shenfield on the Great Eastern Main Line.

Service table

Connections

Heathrow Terminals 2 & 3 railway station is close to London Underground Heathrow Terminals 2 & 3 tube station where Piccadilly line trains run to Terminals 4 and 5 and to central London.

Heathrow Central also offers an interchange via underground walkways with bus and coach services from Heathrow Central bus station. London Buses routes from the bus station include 105, 111, 278, 285, A10, U3, X26, X140 and night routes N9 and N140, while non-TfL local buses include 4, 7 (limited service), 8 (one journey only), 555 and 724.

See also
Heathrow Terminals 2 & 3 tube station
Heathrow Terminal 4 tube station
Heathrow Terminal 5 tube station

References

External links

 – transport map for Heathrow showing Underground, Heathrow Express and Heathrow Connect rail, and the N9 night bus

Railway stations in the London Borough of Hillingdon
Railway stations opened by Railtrack
Railway stations in Great Britain opened in 1998
Railway stations served by Heathrow Express
Railway stations served by the Elizabeth line
Airport railway stations in the United Kingdom
Central Station
1998 establishments in England